DESTO and/or Desto may refer to:
DESTO (Pakistan), the Defence Science and Technology Organization
Desto Records, a defunct American classical music record label based in New York active 1964-1982
Dr. Desto, a villain in the Hanna Barbera cartoon Samson & Goliath
Desto (Pty) Ltd, a company registered in South Africa in 1994, that provides Education, Training and Development and Consulting and Recruitment Services

See also
DSTO (disambiguation)